The People's Party is a political alliance in Georgia. It was founded on March 12, 2006 based on an initiative group. Party Direction: Leftist Centers. The members of the initiative group were Asmat Muradashvili, Giorgi Odzeli, Kakhaber Firuashvili, David Kvachadze, Jumber Tavartkiladze, Roin Khizjakadze and Akaki Panchulidze. The initiative group held a party congress on June 9, 2007, and the congress elected the Supreme Council of the Political Council. The political council chose the chairperson and executive secretary of the party. Koba Davitashvili was elected as chairman and Asmat Muradashvili as executive secretary. The members of the political council were Giorgi Odzeli, Akaki Panchulidze, Kakhaber Firuashvili, Roin Khizhakadze, Jumber Tavartkiladze, Teiran Noniashvili, David Bitsadze and Davit Kvachadze.

Organizational structure
The People's Party actively participated in the elections together with the United Opposition parties, after which it became a qualified party after the 2008 parliamentary elections. The party released its newspaper "People's Party", which was spread throughout Georgia.

In 2008, Koba Davitashvili, candidate for the parliamentary elections in Zugdidi district, became a majoritarian candidate. In 2009, the People's Party actively participated in the cells. On behalf of the National Council in 2010 local elections, three parties merged: "People's Party", "Conservative Party of Georgia" and "Movement for Fair Georgia".

In 2010 local elections Koba Davitashvili, chairman of the party "People's Party" became a member of the party. In 2011, the political party of the People's Party unanimously decided that Koba Davitashvili was elected by the Georgian Dream's election list, after which Koba Davitashvili became member of the Parliament of Georgia in the October 2012 elections. Then in Tbilisi City Council Koba Davitashvili was replaced by a member of the political council Kakhaber Firuashvili, who headed the Environmental Commission in the Sakrebulo. In 2013 Koba Davitashvili left the parliamentary majority and ran for the presidency and took 1.2% of votes, after which Davitashvili left the position of "People's Party" in April 2014 as well. On 27 June 2015, "People's Party" chose Alexander Shalaberidze, who died suddenly on July 1, 2015, after which the party stopped working, but remained registered. On January 21, 2017, "People's Party" held an extraordinary congress and Aleksandre Kobaidze was elected as chairman of the party.

Heads of Party
 Koba Davitashvili (2007-2014)
 Alexander Shalamberidze (2015, 27 June-2015, 1 July ±)
 Aleksandre Kobaidze (2017, 21 January-)

References
 Profile of party on Facebook
 Official web-page 

2006 establishments in Georgia (country)
Conservative parties in Georgia (country)
Centre-right parties in Georgia (country)